Hugh Stewart Kerr (1882 – 10 April 1918) was a Scottish footballer. His regular position was as a forward. He played for Westerlea, Ayr, and Manchester United. Kerr joined Ayr from Westerlea in 1903, but only spent half a season there before joining Manchester United in January 1904. However, the Ayr officials were of the opinion that United had made an illegal, unofficial approach to sign Kerr, and an enquiry into the transfer was set up by the International Football Association Board (IFAB). Kerr made his Manchester United debut in a 2–1 defeat away to Blackpool on 9 March 1904, followed by another appearance in a 2–0 home win over Grimsby Town on 26 March. The IFAB found United innocent of any illicit contact with Kerr about a week later, but he was ultimately released at the end of the season.

Personal life 
Kerr served as a private in the London Scottish during World War I and died of wounds on 10 April 1918. He was buried in Étaples Military Cemetery.

References

External links
Profile at StretfordEnd.co.uk
Profile at MUFCInfo.com

1882 births
Scottish footballers
Manchester United F.C. players
1918 deaths
English Football League players
Scottish Football League players
Place of birth missing
Ayr F.C. players
British military personnel killed in World War I
British Army personnel of World War I
London Scottish soldiers
Association football forwards
Burials at Étaples Military Cemetery